Vladimir Cosse (born 30 September 1967) is a former Moldovan international footballer, retired in 2002.

International goals

References

External links
 
 
 
 
 
 Profile at scoreshelf.com
 

1967 births
Living people
People from Chernogorsk
Moldovan footballers
Soviet footballers
Moldova international footballers
Moldovan people of Greek descent
Ukrainian emigrants to Moldova
Association football forwards
PFC CSKA Moscow players
FC Lokomotiv Moscow players
FC Zirka Kropyvnytskyi players
MFC Mykolaiv players
SC Tavriya Simferopol players
CS Tiligul-Tiras Tiraspol players
Moldovan Super Liga players
FC Tobol players
FC Spartak Vladikavkaz players
FC Shinnik Yaroslavl players
FC Asmaral Moscow players
FC Avangard Kursk players
FC Salyut Belgorod players
Sportspeople from Khakassia